Heavy Lies the Crown is the fifth studio album by underground hip hop collective Army of the Pharaohs. It had an initial release set for November 2014, but it was confirmed that it would be released a month earlier on October 21, 2014 via Vinnie Paz's independent record label Enemy Soil.

Background
On August 6, 2014, it was announced that Heavy Lies the Crown would be released on October 21, 2014, six months after their previous album In Death Reborn. King Magnetic is the only artist from the previous album to not make an appearance. Lawrence Arnell makes two guest appearances on the album after he was featured on one track on In Death Reborn.

Track listing

Personnel
Album credits adapted from AllMusic.

 Army of the Pharaohs — Primary Artist
 7L — Producer
 David Albaladejo — Composer, Featured Artist
 Marcus Albaladejo — Composer, Featured Artist
 Apathy — Composer, Featured Artist
 Lawrence Arnell — Featured Artist
 Stu Bangas — Producer
 Christopher Bauss — Composer
 Beatnick Dee — Producer
 Blacastan — Featured Artist
 Dan Bradley — Design, Photography
 Celph Titled — Composer, Featured Artist
 C-Lance — Producer
 Demoz — Featured Artist
 Des Devious — Featured Artist
 DJ Kwestion — Cuts
 DJ Skizz — Producer
 Esoteric — Featured Artist
 The Forefathers — Design, Layout
 Frank Dukes — Producer
 Zilla — Featured Artist, Composer
 Pete Humphreys — Mastering
 Craig Lanciani — Composer
 Kevin Lavitt — Composer, Producer
 Vinnie Paz — Composer, Featured Artist
 Block McCloud  —  Featured Artist
 MTK — Producer
 Juan Muteniac — Producer
 Nero — Producer
 Doap Nixon — Featured Artist
 I. Osu — Composer
 Mario Collazo — Featured Artist
 Z. Raerner — Composer
 Reef the Lost Cauze — Featured Artist
 Shuko — Producer
 Todd Spadafone — Composer, Producer
 Scott Stallone — Engineer, Mixing
 Twiz the Beat Pro — Producer

References

Army of the Pharaohs albums
2014 albums
Babygrande Records albums
Enemy Soil Records albums
Demigodz Records albums
Albums produced by Frank Dukes